The churches of Baltimore are numerous and diverse. Baltimore has many historic and significant churches, as well as many smaller and newer ones.

African Methodist Episcopal Church

Apostolic

Baptist

Christian Science

Episcopal

See the Episcopal Diocese of Maryland.

Friends (Quaker)

Black Hebrew Israelite

Evangelical Lutheran

Mennonite

Methodist

Methodist Episcopal

United Methodist

Orthodox Church

Greek Orthodox

Orthodox Church in America (OCA)
Jurisdiction: Diocese of Washington

Russian Orthodox
Jurisdiction: Russian Orthodox Church in the USA

Pentecostal

Presbyterian

Reformed Episcopal

Roman Catholic

Ukrainian Catholic

Unitarian

United Brethren

See also

External links
Churches in the Baltimore area
Baltimore churches
South Baltimore churches
Churches in Baltimore

Baltimore-related lists

Baltimore
Churches in Baltimore